Bärbel Wohlleben (born 26 December 1943) is a former German football player. In 1974, she won the first German women's championship officially organized by the German Football Association with TuS Wörrstadt winning the championship. Wohlleben's goal in a 3-0 victory on 8 September 1974 against DJK Eintracht Erle was voted Goal of the Month by the television viewers of Sportschau it was first to be won by a woman .

Award
2022: Induction into the Hall of Fame of German football

Literature

Rainer Hennies, Daniel Meuren (Hrsg.): Frauenfußball. Der lange Weg zur Anerkennung. Verlag Die Werkstatt, 2009, ISBN 978-3-89533-639-3.
Hardy Grüne: Enzyklopädie des deutschen Ligafußballs. Band 2: Bundesliga & Co. 1963 bis heute. 1. Liga, 2. Liga, DDR Oberliga. Zahlen, Bilder, Geschichten. AGON Sportverlag, Kassel 1997, ISBN 3-89609-113-1.

References

1943 births
FSV Frankfurt (women) players
People from Rhenish Hesse
German women's footballers
German female handball players
Women's association footballers not categorized by position
Living people